In abstract algebra and multilinear algebra, a multilinear form on a vector space  over a field  is a map

that is separately -linear in each of its  arguments. More generally, one can define multilinear forms on a module over a commutative ring. The rest of this article, however, will only consider multilinear forms on finite-dimensional vector spaces.

Tensor product 
Given a -tensor  and an -tensor , a product , known as the tensor product, can be defined by the property

 

for all .  The tensor product of multilinear forms is not commutative; however it is bilinear and associative:

 , 

and

 

Consequently,  has dimensionality .

Examples

Bilinear forms

If ,  is referred to as a bilinear form.  A familiar and important example of a (symmetric) bilinear form is the standard inner product (dot product) of vectors.

Alternating multilinear forms

An important class of multilinear forms are the alternating multilinear forms, which have the additional property that

 

where  is a permutation and  denotes its sign (+1 if even, –1 if odd).  As a consequence, alternating multilinear forms are antisymmetric with respect to swapping of any two arguments (i.e.,  and ):

 

With the additional hypothesis that the characteristic of the field  is not 2, setting  implies as a corollary that ; that is, the form has a value of 0 whenever two of its arguments are equal.  Note, however, that some authors use this last condition as the defining property of alternating forms.  This definition implies the property given at the beginning of the section, but as noted above, the converse implication holds only when .

Note that linear functionals (multilinear 1-forms over ) are trivially alternating, so that , while, by convention, 0-forms are defined to be scalars: .

The determinant on  matrices, viewed as an  argument function of the column vectors, is an important example of an alternating multilinear form.

Exterior product 
The tensor product of alternating multilinear forms is, in general, no longer alternating.

 

where the sum is taken over the set of all permutations over  elements, .  The exterior product is bilinear, associative, and graded-alternating: if  and  then . 

Differential forms

Differential forms are mathematical objects constructed via tangent spaces and multilinear forms that behave, in many ways, like differentials in the classical sense.  Though conceptually and computationally useful, differentials are founded on ill-defined notions of infinitesimal quantities developed early in the history of calculus.  Differential forms provide a mathematically rigorous and precise framework to modernize this long-standing idea.  Differential forms are especially useful in multivariable calculus (analysis) and differential geometry because they possess transformation properties that allow them be integrated on curves, surfaces, and their higher-dimensional analogues (differentiable manifolds).  One far-reaching application is the modern statement of Stokes' theorem, a sweeping generalization of the fundamental theorem of calculus to higher dimensions.  

The synopsis below is primarily based on Spivak (1965) and Tu (2011).

Definition of differential k-forms and construction of 1-forms 

In brief, a differential -form is a -covector field.

We first construct differential 1-forms from 0-forms and deduce some of their basic properties. To simplify the discussion below, we will only consider smooth differential forms constructed from smooth functions. Let  be a smooth function. (Recall that the total derivative is a linear transformation.) The 1-forms  are known as the basic 1-forms; they are conventionally denoted . Furthermore, we can derive an expression for  that coincides with the classical expression for a total differential:

 

[Comments on notation: In this article, we follow the convention from tensor calculus and differential geometry in which multivectors and multicovectors are written with lower and upper indices, respectively. Since differential forms are multicovector fields, upper indices are employed to index them. The opposite rule applies to the components of multivectors and multicovectors, which instead are written with upper and lower indices, respectively. In addition, superscripts appearing in the denominator of an expression (as in ) are treated as lower indices in this convention. When indices are applied and interpreted in this manner, the number of upper indices minus the number of lower indices in each term of an expression is conserved, both within the sum and across an equal sign, a feature that serves as a useful mnemonic device and helps pinpoint errors made during manual computation.]

Basic operations on differential k-forms 
The exterior product and exterior derivative are two fundamental operations on differential forms.  The exterior product of a -form and an -form is a -form, while the exterior derivative of a -form is a -form.  Thus, both operations generate differential forms of higher degree from those of lower degree.

The exterior product  of differential forms is a special case of the exterior product of multicovectors in general (see above).  As is true in general for the exterior product, the exterior product of differential forms is bilinear, associative, and is graded-alternating.

 

Furthermore, for any set of indices ,

 

Since ,  implies that .

The collection of the exterior products of basic 1-forms  constitutes a basis for the space of differential k-forms.  Thus, any  can be written in the form

 

where  are smooth functions.

In the previous section, the 1-form  was defined by taking the exterior derivative of the 0-form (continuous function) . If the standard presentation of -form  is given by (*), the -form  is defined by

 

A property of  that holds for all smooth forms is that the second exterior derivative of any  vanishes identically: .

Integration of differential forms and Stokes' theorem for chains 
To integrate a differential form over a parameterized domain, we first need to introduce the notion of the pullback of a differential form.  Roughly speaking, when a differential form is integrated, applying the pullback transforms it in a way that correctly accounts for a change-of-coordinates.   

 

 

Next, we consider a domain of integration parameterized by a differentiable function , known as an n-cube.

 

To integrate over more general domains, we define an -chain  as the formal sum of -cubes and set

 

Analogously, a differential form  on a general smooth manifold is a map . Stokes' theorem can be further generalized to arbitrary smooth manifolds-with-boundary and even certain "rough" domains (see the article on Stokes' theorem for details).

See also
Bilinear map
Exterior algebra
Homogeneous polynomial
Linear form
Multilinear map

References

Abstract algebra
Linear algebra
Multilinear algebra